An administrative court is a type of court specializing in administrative law, particularly disputes concerning the exercise of public power. Their role is to ascertain that official acts are consistent with the law. Such courts are considered separate from general courts.

The administrative acts are recognized from the hallmark that they become binding without the consent of the other involved parties. The contracts between authorities and legal persons governed by private law fall usually to the jurisdiction of the general court system. Official decisions contested in administrative courts include:
taxation
dispensation of monetary benefits
environmental licenses
building inspection
child custody
involuntary commitment
immigration decisions
summary public payments (other than fines imposed by general courts)

In several countries, in addition to general courts, there is a separate system of administrative courts, where the general and administrative systems do not have jurisdiction over each other. Accordingly, there is a local administrative court of first instance, possibly an appeals court and a Supreme Administrative Court separate from the general Supreme Court.

The parallel system is found in countries like Egypt, Greece, Germany, France, Italy, some of the Nordic Countries, Portugal, Taiwan and others. In France, Greece, Portugal and Sweden, the system has three levels like the general system, with local courts, appeal courts and a Supreme Administrative Court. In Finland, Italy, Poland and Taiwan, the system has two levels, where the court of first instance is a regional court. In Germany, the system is more complicated, and courts are more specialized.

In Sweden and Finland, legality of decisions of both state agencies and municipal authorities can be appealed to the administrative courts. In accordance with the principle of the legal autonomy of municipalities, administrative courts can (if not stipulated otherwise) only review and rule on the formal legality of the decision, not its content. In the case of state agencies, administrative courts may rule on the actual content of the decision.

The United States does not have a separate system of administrative courts.  Instead, administrative law judges (ALJs) preside over tribunals within executive branch agencies.  In American jurisprudence, ALJs are always regarded as part of the executive branch, despite their quasi-judicial adjudicative role, because of the strict separation of powers imposed by the United States Constitution. Decisions of ALJs can be appealed to courts in the judicial branch.

Notably, in 1952, the Communist East German government abolished the administrative courts as "bourgeois". This limited the citizens' ability to contest official decisions. In 1989, re-establishment of the system began in DDR, but the German reunification made this initiative obsolete.

List
 The Administrative Court is a specialist court of the King's Bench Division of the High Court of Justice in England and Wales
 Administrative courts in Greece
 Supreme Administrative Court of the Republic of Poland
 Administrative Court of Austria
 Administrative courts in Albania
 Administrative Courts in Finland
 Administrative courts in Sweden
 Administrative courts in Mongolia
 Administrative Court of Thailand

References

Administrative law
Courts by type